Frankenberg may refer to:

Places
 Frankenberg, Hesse, a town in Hesse, Germany
 Frankenberg, Saxony, a town in Saxony, Germany
 Waldeck-Frankenberg, a district in Hesse, Germany

Persons
 Frankenberg family, an ancient noble family from Silesia
 Abraham von Franckenberg, German-Silesian Lutheran mystic, poet and hymn-writer
 Friedrich von Frankenberg, Australian-German mystic and early founder of Sufism in Australia
 Cardinal Joannes-Henricus de Franckenberg, German-Silesian Roman Catholic Archbishop of Mechelen, Primate of the Low Countries and cardinal 
 Richard von Frankenberg, German-Silesian journalist and race-car driver
 Ronald Frankenberg, British anthropologist
 Ruth Frankenberg, British sociologist and Ronald Frankenberg's daughter